The Zatch Bell! anime/manga series had video games, most of which were published in Japan only. Ten Zatch Bell! video games were only published in Japan with half of them being Game Boy Advance titles but three games were localized in North America including Zatch Bell! Mamodo Battles, Zatch Bell! Electric Arena, and Zatch Bell! Mamodo Fury. Konjiki no Gash Bell!! Unare! Yūjō no Zakeru 2 was planned to be localized in North America as Zatch Bell! Electric Arena 2 but it was canceled for unknown reasons.

Game Boy Advance games

PlayStation 2 and GameCube games

References

Zatch Bell! (video game series)
Zatch Bell! (video game series)
 
Video games based on anime and manga
Lists of video games by franchise